The Char D3 was a French tank. It was Char D1's colonial version.

History 
In the early 1930s, when Char D had not entered production, Renault was ordered to develop an improved version and a colonial version of Char D. Eventually, the improved version developed into Char D2, and the colonial version developed into Char D3, which has never entered production.

See also 
Char D1
Char D2

References 

Tanks of the interwar period
Tanks of France